In mathematics and quantum mechanics, a Dirac operator is a differential operator that is a formal square root, or half-iterate, of a second-order operator such as a Laplacian. The original case which concerned Paul Dirac was to factorise formally an operator for Minkowski space, to get a form of quantum theory compatible with special relativity; to get the relevant Laplacian as a product of first-order operators he introduced spinors. It was first published in 1928.

Formal definition

In general, let D be a first-order differential operator acting on a vector bundle V over a Riemannian manifold M. If 

where ∆ is the Laplacian of V, then D is called a Dirac operator.

In high-energy physics, this requirement is often relaxed: only the second-order part of D2 must equal the Laplacian.

Examples

Example 1 
D = −i ∂x is a Dirac operator on the tangent bundle over a line.

Example 2 
Consider a simple bundle of notable importance in physics: the configuration space of a particle with spin  confined to a plane, which is also the base manifold.  It is represented by a wavefunction 

where x and y are the usual coordinate functions on R2. χ specifies the probability amplitude for the particle to be in the spin-up state, and similarly for η. The so-called spin-Dirac operator can then be written

where σi are the Pauli matrices. Note that the anticommutation relations for the Pauli matrices make the proof of the above defining property trivial. Those relations define the notion of a Clifford algebra.

Solutions to the Dirac equation for spinor fields are often called harmonic spinors.

Example 3 
Feynman's Dirac operator describes the propagation of a free fermion in three dimensions and is elegantly written 

using the Feynman slash notation. In introductory textbooks to quantum field theory, this will appear in the form

It acts on a four-component wave function , the Sobolev space of smooth, square-integrable functions. It can be extended to a self-adjoint operator on that domain. The square, in this case, is not the Laplacian, but instead  (after setting )

Example 4 
Another Dirac operator arises in Clifford analysis. In euclidean n-space this is

where {ej: j = 1, ..., n} is an orthonormal basis for euclidean n-space, and Rn is considered to be embedded in a Clifford algebra. 

This is a special case of the Atiyah–Singer–Dirac operator acting on sections of a spinor bundle.

Example 5 
For a spin manifold, M, the Atiyah–Singer–Dirac operator is locally defined as follows: For  and e1(x), ..., ej(x) a local orthonormal basis for the tangent space of M at x, the Atiyah–Singer–Dirac operator is

where  is the spin connection, a lifting of the Levi-Civita connection on M to the spinor bundle over M.  The square in this case is not the Laplacian, but instead  where  is the scalar curvature of the connection.

Example 6 
On Riemannian manifold  of dimension  with Levi-Civita connection and an orthonormal basis , we can define exterior derivative  and coderivative  as

.

Then we can define a Dirac-Kähler operator , as follows

.

The operator acts on sections of Clifford bundle in general, and it can be restricted to spinor bundle, an ideal of Clifford bundle, only if the projection operator on the ideal is parallel.

Generalisations 
In Clifford analysis, the operator  acting on spinor valued functions defined by 

is sometimes called Dirac operator in k Clifford variables. This is a common generalization of the Dirac operator and the Dolbeault operator (k arbitrary). It is an invariant differential operator, invariant under the action of the group . The resolution of D is known only in some special cases.

See also

AKNS hierarchy
Dirac equation
Clifford algebra
Clifford analysis
Connection
Dolbeault operator
Heat kernel
Spinor bundle

References

 
 

Differential operators
Quantum mechanics
Mathematical physics